Kazan International Airport (IATA: KZN, ICAO: UWKD) is an airport in Russia, around 25 km southeast of Kazan. It is the largest airport in Tatarstan, and the 15th-busiest airport in Russia. The Kazan International Airport serves the nearly 3.8 million citizens of the region.

History
 

On 15 September 1979, Kazan 2 was completed. On 28 September 1984, Kazan 1 (located inside the city) was shut down, and Kazan 2 was renamed to Kazan Domestic Airport. On 21 February 1986, Kazan Airport gained international rank. This was a drastic announcement, because the USSR Council of Ministers only rarely allowed its citizens to fly out of the USSR.

In 1991, after the fall of the Soviet Union, the Tatarstan region separated from USSR's single Aeroflot airline and created Tatarstan Airlines. This airline didn't gain an efficient amount of investments in its 22 years of service, and its operating license was officially terminated on 31 December 2013 after a disaster.

On 26 October 1992, Kazan got its first international regular flight: Kazan - Istanbul - Kazan. This flight was (and still is) operated by Turkish Airlines and 145 annual trips are made to and from Istanbul, making it the most popular international route.

In 2008, Tatarstan's president, Mintimer Shaimiev, after winning the bid for the 2013 Universiade Olympic Games, began creating a set of major reform projects of Kazan. Apart from repairing the streets, bringing in investments, integrating English language and improving the bus route system in Kazan, Shaimiev also began to completely redesign Kazan's airport. He designed the blueprints for Terminal 1A, and planned out the complete refining of the airport between 2008 and 2025. Shaimiev's successor and today's president of Tatarstan, Rustam Minnikhanov, used the blueprints, which were made in 2009, to begin the construction of Terminal 1A and a complete redesign of Terminal 1 (essentially also a new reconstruction).

First, a new 3,700 meter runway was built, and edge lights were added on both of the runways. This made it possible for the airport to operate 24/7. In 2012, a new airport fire station was built. In 2012, the construction of Terminal 1A began. Later that year, Terminal 1 began its own renovation. Terminal 1A was officially opened on 7 November 2012. Terminal 1 finished renovations on 22 June 2013.

Today, the new airport has more than 30 check-in slots and seven conveyor belts. It has three separate duty-free shops, selling merchandise such as alcohol, cigars and cigarettes, chocolates. It offers popular brands such as Costa Coffee. The airport can sustain around three million passengers. Further expansions and the creation of Terminal 2 will occur before the 2018 FIFA World Cup.

Following the Skytrax Airport and Airline Awards, Kazan Airport was nominated for 4 stars in 2014, and was called Russia's and CIS's best airport.

Following the opening of new air routes and an increase of flights through existing routes, the Kazan Airport reached a record of 2.5 million passengers transported in less than a year at the beginning December 2017.

Airlines and destinations

Statistics

Passenger statistics

Arrivals and departures

Cargo handled

Other facilities
Tatarstan Airlines had its head office on the airport property.

Accidents and incidents

On 17 November 2013, Tatarstan Airlines Flight 363, a Boeing 737-500, operating for Tatarstan Airlines, crashed while attempting to land at the airport. All 44 passengers and six crew members died. Investigations revealed the pilot had not completed his primary flight training, a revelation which then led the Russia's Federal Air Transport Agency (Rosaviatsiya) to revoke hundreds of pilots' licenses.

On 21 December 2016, a man drove his car through the airport's terminal while under the influence of drugs, causing an estimated  in damage. The suspect, identified as Ruslan Nurtdinov, was charged with violating traffic rules, endangerment, and drug trafficking.

See also

List of the busiest airports in Europe
List of the busiest airports in the former USSR

References

External links

  Kazan International Airport official website

Airports built in the Soviet Union
Airports in Tatarstan
Transport in Kazan
Buildings and structures in Kazan